Zhelannoye is a rural locality (a selo) in Mosolovskoye Rural Settlement, Anninsky District, Voronezh Oblast, Russia. The population was 301 as of 2010. There are 3 streets.

Geography 
Zhelannoye is located 7 km north of Anna (the district's administrative centre) by road. Anna is the nearest rural locality.

References 

Rural localities in Anninsky District